James T. Welch (born December 22, 1975 in Springfield, Massachusetts) was a Democratic member of the Massachusetts Senate from the Hampden district, who was first elected to this position in 2010. Prior to this he was the Massachusetts State Representative for the 6th Hampden district, which includes his hometown of West Springfield and parts of Springfield and Chicopee. He served in the House from 2005 to 2011. Prior to serving in the Massachusetts legislature, he was a realtor and member of the West Springfield City Council.

Welch lost his re-election bid for a sixth term in the 2020 Democratic primary to Springfield City Councilor Adam Gomez.

See also
 2019–2020 Massachusetts legislature

References

1975 births
Democratic Party members of the Massachusetts House of Representatives
Democratic Party Massachusetts state senators
American real estate brokers
People from West Springfield, Massachusetts
Living people
Massachusetts city council members
Politicians from Springfield, Massachusetts
21st-century American politicians